Lena is an unincorporated community in Rapides Parish, Louisiana, United States. Its ZIP code is 71447.

Notes

Unincorporated communities in Rapides Parish, Louisiana
Unincorporated communities in Louisiana